Frédéric Fregevize, a Swiss landscape painter, was born in Geneva in 1770, and died there in 1849. He lived for a long time in Berlin, and was elected in 1820 to membership of the Academy; he returned to Geneva in 1829, and went to Dessau in 1839. The Berlin National Gallery contains views painted by him of The Lake of Geneva, and The Valley of the Rhone, near Geneva.

References
 

1770 births
1849 deaths
18th-century Swiss painters
18th-century Swiss male artists
Swiss male painters
19th-century Swiss painters
Swiss landscape painters
18th-century artists from the Republic of Geneva
19th-century Swiss male artists